Jacks Island is an alluvial island in the Allegheny River. Its southwestern half lies in the city of Lower Burrell, while its northeastern half lies in Allegheny Township, in Westmoreland County in the U.S. state of Pennsylvania. The island is situated across from Harrison Township in Allegheny County.

The elevation of Jacks Island is 745 feet above sea level.

References

External links
U.S. Army Corps of Engineers navigation charts
Westmoreland County, Pennsylvania islands

River islands of Pennsylvania
Islands of the Allegheny River in Pennsylvania
Landforms of Westmoreland County, Pennsylvania